Autistic Pride Day is a pride celebration for autistic people held on 18 June each year. Autistic pride recognises the importance of pride for autistic people and its role in bringing about positive changes in the broader society.

Although Autistic Pride Day is 18 June, pride events are often held on the weekend of that year for logistical reasons, but can be held at any time during the year.

Origins 
Autistic Pride Day was first celebrated in 2005 by Aspies For Freedom (AFF), who selected 18 June because it was the birthday of the youngest member of the group at that time. AFF modelled the celebration on the gay pride movement. According to Kabie Brook, the co-founder of Autism Rights Group Highland (ARGH), "the most important thing to note about the day is that it is an autistic community event: it originated from and is still led by autistic people ourselves", i.e. it is not a day for other charities or organisations to promote themselves or stifle autistic people. The rainbow infinity symbol is used as the symbol of this day, representing "diversity with infinite variations and infinite possibilities". New Scientist magazine released an article entitled "Autistic and proud" on the first Autistic Pride Day that discussed the idea.

Organisations around the world celebrate Autistic Pride Day, with events around the world, to connect with one another through autistic events and demonstrate to allistic people (those not on the autism spectrum) that autistic people are unique individuals who should not be seen as cases for treatment.  Writing for the Houston Press, Jef Rouner recommended five songs for Autistic Pride Day that celebrate difference and were written by autistic people.

Autistic pride points out that autistic people have always been an important part of human society. Being autistic is a form of neurodiversity. As with all forms of neurodiversity, most of the challenges autistic people face come from other people's attitudes about autism and a lack of supports and accommodations (ableism), rather than being essential to the autistic condition. For instance, according to Larry Arnold and Gareth Nelson, many autism-related organizations promote feelings of pity for parents, rather than fostering understanding.  Autistic activists have contributed to a shift in attitudes away from the notion that autism is a deviation from the norm that must be treated or cured. Autistic self-advocacy organizations, which are led and run by autistic people, are a key force in the movement for autistic acceptance and autistic pride.

Joseph Redford, an organiser for Autistic Pride at London's Hyde Park, stated in a speech that the concept of autistic pride is not about a single day or event:

As autistic pride has continued to develop, autistic advocates have become increasingly professionalised, with Autistic Pride Reading incorporating as a charity in 2018, and holding a pride event which attracted over 700 people.

During the COVID-19 pandemic, with physical events impossible, autistic advocates collaborated under the Autistic Pride Alliance to create an Autistic Pride Online Celebration which hosted speakers from four continents.

Past events 
There have been a number of Autistic Pride Day events hosted over the years to promote the self-affirmation, identity, dignity and equality of autistic people around the world. Most events happen during the summer months between June and August. The Lead Organiser for London's Autistic Pride, which is traditionally held on the Saturday closest to 18 June, officially known as Autistic Pride Day. For the last two years, most events dropped off the calendar due to the Coronavirus pandemic, replaced by an online global iteration. Autistic Pride Day 2020 was an eleven-hour marathon that was hosted on YouTube and the event was repeated in 2021. For 2022, many local autistic communities are hoping to get back to their previous planning of their events.

See also
Autism rights movement
Autistic Self Advocacy Network (ASAN) –  seeks to advance the principles of the disability rights movement in the world of autism.
List of autism-related topics
World Autism Awareness Day

References

External links
 
 
 
 

Autism activism
Unofficial observances
Disability observances
Disability rights
June observances
International observances